3B or 3-B may refer to:
 Third baseman
 Triple (baseball)
 3B Computers, a range of computers produced by AT&T during the 1980s
 3B Junior, a department of the Japanese entertainment company Stardust Promotion
 3B Lab, a Japanese popular music group
 Three Bs, a designation for three well-known classical composers

 may refer to:

See also
B3 (disambiguation)